The Humber Hawk is a four-cylinder automobile manufactured from 1945 to 1967 by British-based Humber Limited.

Humber Hawk Mk I & II

The Hawk, a re-badged Hillman 14 (1938-1940) was the first Humber car to be launched after World War II. Slightly longer because of the new bootlid superimposed on its fastback tail and narrower having shed its running boards it also managed to be  lighter than the prewar car.

The engine, from the Hillman 14 but uprated almost ten percent to an output of 56 bhp, was shared with Sunbeam Talbot's 90s. It drove the Hawk's live rear axle through a four-speed gearbox with centrally located floor change.

As with the Hillman the four-door body was mounted on a separate chassis and was of the six-light design (three windows on each side) with a sunshine roof as standard. Suspension was independent at the front using a transverse leaf spring, and at the rear the axle had half-elliptic springs.

The Mark II version of September 1947 was not even a facelift, the main difference being a column gear change with a control ring fitted to the gearbox making it impossible to crash the syncromesh gears. The engine was given a new water jacket, the petrol tank received a breather to prevent air-locks and provision was made for a car-radio and retracting aerial. There was no change to the car's external appearance.

Humber Hawk Mark III to V

Mark III
The Mark III Hawk was a completely new car and was first shown at the London Motor Show in October 1948, but it still retained the earlier engine (side-valves, 1944 cc, 56 bhp at 3800 rpm) and transmission albeit with new rubber mountings. The new body was styled by the Loewy Studio and the separate headlights of the old model were gone, along with the separate front wings. The chassis was new, with coil-sprung independent front suspension replacing the previous transverse leaf spring. The body was now an integral component of the car's structure. The rear axle was also a new design with hypoid gearing. The body could be finished in a wide range of colours, both as two-tone and metallic. The metallic finishes would be offered on all the Hawks until the model's demise in late 1967/early 1968.

The rear seat was a full  wider. Overall the car was  shorter and  lower. Despite the lower height the new hypoid back axle allowed more head room in the rear seat.
Mark IV
In the early spring of 1951 the Mark IV version arrived with a larger, 2267 cc engine incorporating, as before, an aluminium cylinder head and with a 58 instead of 56 bhp output. However, at mid range speeds around 15 percent more power was generated. The Mark IV also used larger, 15-inch wheels. The steering was now more highly geared and was commended by commentators for its lightness when manoeuvering the car in a confined space despite 53% of the car's  being carried by the front wheels.

The test car cost £850, including taxes.
Mark V
The Mark V Hawk announced in September 1952 was given a larger clutch, larger rear shock absorbers, a strengthened body-frame and other minor mechanical changes. A new treatment was given to the car's front. It was also available as a "luxury touring limousine". A lowered bonnet line and wrap-around bumpers with over-riders distinguished this model from the Mk IV

Humber Hawk Mark VI and VIA

The main change with the Mk VI, which was introduced in June 1954, was the fitting of an overhead-valve cylinder head to the engine. The rear of the body was slightly changed, which made the car longer. In 1955 an estate version with fold-down tailgate appeared.

The April 1956 Mk VIA was a fairly minor upgrade, with changes mainly to the interior. A de-luxe version was added to the range.

A replacement, slightly more powerful and with an entirely new body was announced in May 1957.
 

Road test
The motoring correspondent of The Times claimed that any previous Hawk owner would be "astonished" by the Mark VI's 20 per cent more powerful engine's ability to effortlessly swing the car along at 70 mph. Cold starting was very good. The engine was not always so willing to start when cold. The tyres were inclined to squeal on not very sharp corners taken at any more than a modest speed. The brake lining area is now 40 per cent more than on the Mark V. The driver's windscreen wiper is badly located.

The test car cost £1405, including taxes.

Humber Hawk Series I to IVA

A new Hawk announced in May 1957 had a completely new body with unitary construction which it would go on to share with the 1958 Humber Super Snipe. The new model was, like its predecessors, a large car. For the first time an estate variant was available from the factory - the Hawk estate had the largest unitary bodyshell of any British-built car up to that point, a status it retained until the Jaguar Mark X was launched in 1961. The 2267 cc engine was carried over, though with modifications to the distributor mounting, and other details; and an automatic transmission, the Borg Warner D.G. model, was now available. The body was styled in Rootes' own studios and featured more glass than previous models, with wrap-around front windscreen, which gave it a considerable resemblance to a base model 1955 Chevrolet 4-door sedan. The missing rear quarter-lights were returned in Series IV. The estate version featured a horizontally split tailgate—the lower half opening downwards (to provide an extra length of luggage-platform if necessary) and the upper half upwards. The fuel-filler cap was concealed behind the offside rear reflector.

There were several revisions during the car's life, each resulting in a new Series number.

The 1959 Series 1A had changed gear ratios and minor trim changes.

The Series II launched in October 1960 had disc front brakes, servo-assisted. The automatic option was no longer available on the home market.

The Series III of September 1962 had a larger fuel tank and bigger rear window. The export model automatic option was also dropped.

More significant changes came with the October 1964 Series IV. The roof was made flatter, the rear window smaller and an extra side window fitted behind the rear doors. Synchromesh was fitted to bottom gear. An anti-roll bar was fitted at the rear.

The final Series IVA of 1965 saw the automatic option re-introduced, this time being the Borg Warner Model 35.

Previously reported ...........Some "Series" cars are found with a floor-type gear change replacing the (good quality) standard column-mounted gearstick — these are later owner modifications resembling the original factory option, and the parts necessary for this were obtained from the Commer Karrier Walk-thru–type vans and light lorries which were also made by the Rootes Group at this time. All of the automatic transmission–optioned cars were fitted with the column-type selectors only.

Correction to the immediately preceding section, December 2020..............The “Walk-Thru” was a Rootes commercial vehicle range utilising 'truck duty’ types of chassis, fitted with various van and non-van bodywork arrangements and having a payload of between 30 cwt and 3 tons. Consequently, those chassis utilised a 'truck duty’ type of gearbox, which had nothing in common with any gearbox ever used by Humber.The Series Humber Hawk always shared the underlying design of its manually operated transmission with the so-called 'Light Car Range' models (e.g. ‘Series’ Hillman Minx, ‘Series’ Sunbeam Alpine and Sunbeam Rapier, Hillman Super Minx Mark I to IV and many others, also used on all the Hunter range models and with a special remote shift floor linkage for the Commer and Dodge Light Forward Control vans (and campervans). Many detail differences applied throughout the full set of uses of that gearbox design but the major differences adopted for the Hawk use were in the connection to the propeller shaft (flange for The Hawk, with splines within the propshaft ; splined mainshaft rear coupling and a fixed length propshaft elsewhere) and in the detail of the column change gear selection covers needed to suit the linkages that were attached to the Hawk bodyshell and its column mounted gear shift lever. Note also that all the relevant Rootes models adopted a revised gearbox design circa 1964, which was a redesign that provided synchromesh for first gear and a larger diameter first motion shaft. Gear selection covers for either column or floor change cannot be interchanged between the ‘all synchromesh’ boxes and the predecessor design, as the redesign also relocated the reverse gear idler mechanism from the right hand side of the gearbox to the left hand side, so the three selector shafts were relocated accordingly and the gear shift pattern went from ‘reverse on the left via a detent’ to ‘first on the left with no detent required (reverse detent to the right instead)’. However, in both cases there will be a floor change top cover available to match any model of Series Humber Hawk and that can be acquired from any of the Light Car models when fitted with a floor change, as long as the gearbox casing on that vehicle is the same as the relevant Hawk casing. Such a ‘remote’ floor change top cover can simply be installed on to the Hawk gearbox and the Hawk would thus acquire a floor change. However, there will not be enough clearance in the Hawk bodyshell to allow that to be done straight away – bespoke modifications will be required beforehand to provide the necessary ‘tunnel’ clearance for the non-original top cover and a neat means to seal around the floor change lever. The lever itself can also be found in several different configurations, some almost vertical and others cranked a long way towards the rear of the vehicle (e.g. Hillman Hunter, so that type of lever only applicable to all synchromesh gearboxes). For a Hawk with a bench seat an almost vertical lever will be required and even then it will end up quite close to the seat, so three abreast usage of said bench would become less straightforward than might have been applicable hitherto (but only where all relevant safety regulations and advice might still give rise to that sort of usage anyway)

Special case exception possibility – The Hillman Husky and Commer Cob Series I gearboxes used a much longer floor change lever acting directly on the selector mechanism. One of those could be fitted to the type of gearbox used on the Hawk Series I and IA and a different set of bespoke bodyshell clearance changes would then be required.

Supplement to the above – Here is a gearbox top cover variation summary with respect to the matching casing (applies everywhere that this type of gearbox was used, floor and column change)

<LI>No synchromesh on first gear (3-synchro) Version 1 - Eight-hole attachment and a combined dipstick and filler aperture – e.g. Sunbeam Rapier Series I, II & III (early) and Humber Hawk Series I & IA
<LI>No synchromesh on first gear (3-synchro) Version 2 – Six-hole attachment and no dipstick/filler aperture, fluid level checking and filling via a plug in the side of the casing – e.g. Sunbeam Rapier Series III (later), IIIA and IV; Humber Hawk Series II & III
<LI>All synchromesh (4-synchro) – A slightly different six-hole attachment for the revised casing  (dipstick facility now long obsolete), fluid level checking and filling via a plug in the side of the casing  - e.g. Sunbeam Rapier Series V and Fastback; Humber Hawk Series IV

End of December 2020 revision

The test car cost £1261, including taxes of £421.

In March 1967 Rootes announced that production of the Humber Hawk, along with that of the Super Snipe and Imperial had ceased.  The announcement stated that the cars' place in their range would be filled by Chrysler Valiants imported from Australia.

After Hawk production ended, Rootes came to concentrate on sectors offering greater volume, no longer featuring as a UK provider of large family cars. It had, in particular, been unusual for UK manufactured cars of this size to feature a spacious station wagon / estate car version; and, following the demise of the Humber Hawk, the UK market for large estate cars quickly came to be dominated by the Volvo 145, introduced to the UK in March 1968,  and its successors.

Scale models
Meccano Dinky Toys; No. 165 (production 1959–63), Series 1 Hawk, approximately O scale (1:44).
Meccano Dinky Toys; No. 256 (production 1960–64), Series 1 Hawk Police car, approximately O scale (1:44).

References

External links

Post Vintage Humber Car Club
Humber Enthusiasts Group of New South Wales, with many scanned brochures.
Some more brochures .

Hawk
1960s cars
1950s cars
Rear-wheel-drive vehicles
Cars introduced in 1945
Sedans